The Xavier Newswire (established 1915) is an independent newspaper published weekly during the academic year by the students of Xavier University in Cincinnati, Ohio.  It is an 8- to 12-page newspaper, commonly featuring seven sections: Front, Campus News, U.S. & World News, Opinions and Editorials, Sports, Arts & Entertainment and The Back Page.

The Newswire was originally called "The Xavierian News" and was founded by Xavier's law school in 1915.

The staff meets to put together the paper on Wednesday nights. The Publications House, which previous housed the editing team, was demolished on March 10, 2010, and the staff now meets in the Gallagher Student Center on campus. The Newswire made its color debut on January 23, 2008.

Current staff
 Editor-in-chief: Alex Budzynski
 Managing editor: Mo Juenger
 Multimedia managing editor: Hunter Ellis
 Campus news editor: Robbie Dzierzanowski
 U.S. & world news editor: Sophie Boulter
 Op-ed editor: Charlie Gstalder
 Sports editor: Joe Clark
 A&E editor: Kate Ferell
 Back page editor: Aidan Callahan
 Business manager: Melissa Navarra
 Photo editor: Desmond Fischer
 Head copy editor: Molly Hulligan
 Online editor: Nina Benich
 Digital communications manager: Grace Carlo
 Education and enrichment coordinator: Joseph Cotton
 Newswire live show manager: Emma Stevens
 Debates and discussions show manager: Will Pembroke

Former editors-in-chief

Heather Gast (2020)
Kevin Thomas (2019-2020)
Ellen Siefke (2018–2019) 
Jessica Griggs (2016–2018)
Tatum Hunter (2015–2016)
Andrew Koch (2014–2015)
Sabrina Brown (2013–2014)
Rachael Harris (2012–2013)
Jake Heath (2011–2012)
Doug Tifft (2010–2011)
Kathryn Rosenbaum (2009–2010)
Patrick Stevenson (2007–2008)
Brian Bowsher (2006–2007)
Bryon Lorton (2005–2006)
Dan Cox (2003–2005)
Melissa Mosko (2002–2003)
Joe Angolia (2001–2002)
Jonathan Mosko (2000–2001)
Lauren Mosko (1999–2000)
Chad Engelland (1998–1999)
Tom DeCorte (1997–1998)
Kathy Oshel (1991–1992)
Jennifer Stark (1990–91)
Brian Sullivan (1989–90)
Kimberly Grote (1988–89)
Li Viqueira (1987–1988)
Paul Blair (1986–1987)

External links

Weekly newspapers published in the United States
Newspapers published in Cincinnati
Newswire
Student newspapers published in Ohio